"Happy Birthday" is a song by Scottish band Altered Images, released as a single from their 1981 album of the same name. The song entered the UK charts in September 1981 and peaked at number two the following month, holding that position for three weeks. It was the 15th-best-selling single in the UK in 1981 and has been certified silver by the BPI for sales in excess of 250,000 copies.

"Happy Birthday" is the only song on the album that was produced by Martin Rushent, who had already scored major success that year producing for the Human League and would win the Producer of the Year award for 1981 at the BPI Awards. Accordingly, the band chose Rushent to produce their next album, Pinky Blue (1982), in its entirety.

Track listings
7-inch single
A. "Happy Birthday"
B. "So We Go Whispering"

12-inch single
A1. "Happy Birthday"
B1. "So We Go Whispering"
B2. "Jeepster"

Personnel
 Clare Grogan – lead vocals
 Jim McKinven, Tony McDaid – guitars
 Johnny McElhone – bass
 Tich Anderson – drums

Charts

Weekly charts

Year-end charts

Certifications

Cover versions
"Happy Birthday" has been covered by the Ting Tings for the children's television show Yo Gabba Gabba! in 2008, by the Wedding Present for their 1993 compilation album John Peel Sessions 1987–1990, and by Thomas Fagerlund (The Kissaway Trail) with Christian Hjelm (Figurines) for the Danish radio programme Det Elektriske Barometer (The Electric Barometer) in 2010.

References

1981 singles
1981 songs
Altered Images songs
Epic Records singles
Music videos directed by Tim Pope
Portrait Records singles
Song recordings produced by Martin Rushent
Songs about birthday parties
Songs about birthdays